Sempati Air Flight 304 (SSR304) was a scheduled domestic passenger flight, flying from Husein Sastranegara International Airport in Bandung, West Java to Halim Perdanakusuma Airport in Jakarta. On 17 July 1997, the aircraft operating the flight, a Fokker F27 Friendship 600 leased from Trigana Air Service, registered PK-YPM, crashed into a densely populated neighbourhood of Margahayu in Bandung after suffering an engine failure shortly after take-off killing 28 of the occupants and injuring several on the ground. 

Subsequent investigation by the Indonesian National Transportation Safety Committee found out that the aircraft had suffered an engine failure on its left engine; the pilot failed to execute a proper go-around procedure and crashed into the densely populated residential area of Margahayu.

Accident
The aircraft took off from Husein Sastranegara Airport at 11:46 WIB (04:46 UTC), with Bambang Rudy Santoso as PIC. Approximately 3 minutes after take off, the left engine of the Fokker F27 failed and began spewing thick smoke. The pilot contacted Husein Sastranegara ATC, choosing to land at Sulaiman Airbase runway 13. During the emergency landing procedure, the aircraft clipped houses in Margahayu, Bandung and crashed into a muddy field killing 28 people and severely injuring several people on the ground. Most of the victims were families travelling for school holidays.

Aircraft
The aircraft involved in the crash was a Fokker F27 Friendship 600 built in 1969 with a serial number of 10415, delivered to Merpati Nusantara Airlines as PK-MHF in 1974. Later, it was sold to Trigana Air Service in 1993 as PK-YPM, Sempati Air in January 1995 and returned to Trigana Air Service in August 1995.

References

Airliner accidents and incidents caused by mechanical failure
Aviation accidents and incidents in 1997
Aviation accidents and incidents in Indonesia
Accidents and incidents involving the Fokker F27
1997 in Indonesia
July 1997 events in Asia